Andreas Troupis (born 5 April 1973) is a Greek handball player. He competed in the men's tournament at the 2004 Summer Olympics.

References

External links
 

1973 births
Living people
Greek male handball players
Olympic handball players of Greece
Handball players at the 2004 Summer Olympics
Sportspeople from Melbourne